Lynne Heather Walling (October 9, 1958 – May 28, 2021) was an American mathematician specializing in number theory, who became a reader in pure mathematics at the University of Bristol. She was known for her research in  number theory. She died on 28 May 2021.

Early life and education
Walling was born on October 9, 1958, and grew up in northern California. She began her undergraduate studies at the University of California, San Diego, and after a two-year gap continued at Sonoma State University, studying accounting at first but then finishing a bachelor's degree in mathematics. She received her Ph.D. from Dartmouth College in 1987 under Thomas Richard Shemanske.

Career and later life
She then taught at St. Olaf College, Minnesota. She lived in an old farmhouse, which had no indoor plumbing. She built a hand-operated pump, enabling her to install a bathtub in the kitchen, beside a wood-burning stove.

She became a tenure-track Assistant Professor at the University of Colorado, Boulder in 1990. In 1995 she received tenure, and in 2000 became a full Professor. She came to Bristol as a reader in mathematics in 2007. From 2011 to 2015 she was Head of Pure Mathematics, and from 2018 was Director of the Institute of Pure Mathematics.

Awards and honors

In 2012, Walling became a fellow of the American Mathematical Society.

Selected publications
 Hafner, James Lee; Walling, Lynne H. Explicit action of Hecke operators on Siegel modular forms. J. Number Theory 93 (2002), no. 1, 34–57.
 Walling, Lynne H. Hecke operators on theta series attached to lattices of arbitrary rank. Acta Arith. 54 (1990), no. 3, 213–240.
 Merrill, Kathy D.; Walling, Lynne H. Sums of squares over function fields. Duke Math. J. 71 (1993), no. 3, 665–684.

References

External links and references

 Lynne walling's homepage at University of Bristol
 Lynne Walling's homepage at CU Boulder
 Lyne Walling's research
 Lynne Walling's math genealogy page

American women mathematicians
20th-century American mathematicians
21st-century American mathematicians
Fellows of the American Mathematical Society
Year of birth missing (living people)
20th-century women mathematicians
21st-century women mathematicians
20th-century American women
21st-century American women